Diphu railway station (Station Code: DPU) is the main railway station of Diphu town, headquarter of Karbi Anglong district in Assam. It is under Lumding railway division of Northeast Frontier Railway zone of Indian Railways. It is located on Lumding–Dibrugarh section main line of the Indian Railways. Many important trains like Dibrugarh Rajdhani Express, Kamrup Express etc. passes through this station.

Transport 
The station has Auto rickshaw stand. A Bus station is within a minute walk away from station gate. Taxi is available at the gate.

Important trains 
The following important trains halt at Diphu railway station:

 12423/12424 New Delhi - Dibrugarh Town Rajdhani Express
 15906/15907 Dibrugarh–Kanyakumari Vivek Express
 12067/12068 Guwahati–Jorhat Town Jan Shatabdi Express
 15904/15905 Dibrugarh–Chandigarh Express
 15909/15910 Dibrugarh - Lalgarh Avadh Assam Express 
 15959/15960 Dibrugarh-Howrah Kamrup Express via Guwahati
 15645/15646 Dibrugarh - Lokmanya Tilak Terminus Superfast Express
 15933/15934 Dibrugarh–Amritsar Express
 15670/15669 Guwahati - Dibrugarh Town Nagaland Express
 13281/13282 New Tinsukia–Rajendra Nagar Weekly Express
 15665/15666 Guwahati - Mariani BG Express
 22502/22503 New Tinsukia - SMVT Bengaluru Weekly Express
 15941/15942 Jhajha–Dibrugarh Weekly Express
 15641/15642 Silchar - New Tinsukia Barak Brahmaputra Express
 25909/25910 New Tinsukia - Darbhanga Jivachh Link Express

References

Karbi Anglong district
Lumding railway division
Railway stations in Karbi Anglong district